The Computerworld Smithsonian Award is given out annually to individuals who have used technology to produce beneficial changes for society. Nominees are proposed by a group of 100 CEOs of information technology companies. The award has been given since 1989.

Winners

1989 
 1989 - Inaugural winners, all listed: Bell & Howell's Image Plus Search System; Orangeburg School District 5, Orangeburg, South Carolina; Passaic River Basin Early Flood Warning System, Sierra-Micro Inc.; FIX and FAST, Fidelity Investments; The Missing Children Project, University of Illinois; BI Home Escort System; University of Iowa's National Advanced Driving Simulator; Live Aid, Uplinger Enterprise; The Eyegaze Computer, LC Technologies; American Airlines SABRE Reservation Service; The Innovis DesignCenter.

1992 
 1992 — A Search for New Heroes

1993 
 1993 — Pittsburgh Supercomputing Center, a joint project of Carnegie Mellon University and the University of Pittsburgh together with Westinghouse Electric Corporation, established in 1986 by a grant from the National Science Foundation with support from the Commonwealth of Pennsylvania. Its purpose is to develop and make available state-of-the-art high-performance computing for scientific researchers nationwide.

1994 
 1994 — LOS ALAMOS NATIONAL LABORATORY Parallel Ocean Program (POP)

1995 
 1995 — NEW YORK STOCK EXCHANGE, INC. Integrated Technology Plan

1996 
 1996 — Carnegie Mellon FastLab, a multi-university real time financial trading simulator, for visionary use of information technology in the field of education and academia.

1997 
 1997 — METROPOLITAN TORONTO POLICE, the "Metropolis" program, for technology innovations in policing, including the Computer Aided Dispatch (CAD) system, the automated 911 Emergency Response System, the Computer-Aided Scheduling of Courts system, the Repository of Integrated Computer Images (mugshot) system, the Criminals Information Processing System, the Computer Assisted Reconstruction Enhancement System, and many others

1998 
 1998 — UNIVERSITY OF CALIFORNIA, BERKELEY'S SEARCH FOR EXTRATERRESTRIAL INTELLIGENCE (SETI) PROGRAM
 1998 - William E. Kelvie, Fannie Mae, the first internet originated mortgage
 1998 - Mark R. Basile, Incredible Card Corporation, digital biometric emergency health security and retrieval system

1999 
 1999 — Virtual Operating Room

2000 
 2000 — EBay, Montgomery County Public Schools, Department of Primary Industry and Fisheries, Proton World, Independent Electoral Commission of South Africa, Danfoss Drives, National Marrow Donor Program, RealNetworks, Hawkes Ocean Technology, Delta Air Lines, Blackboard Inc., ROGER MAHABIR, CIO, ROYAL BANK OF CANADA DOMINION SECURITIES for advanced internet security techniques support the buying and selling of foreign currencies over the internet, supporting billions of dollars of business in the first year of operation.

Case Study Institutions

See also

 List of awards for contributions to society

References

External links 

 
 

Awards established in 1989
Awards for contributions to society
Smithsonian Institution